The 1920 Giro d'Italia was the eighth edition of the Giro d'Italia, a Grand Tour organized and sponsored by the newspaper La Gazzetta dello Sport. The race was won by the Italian rider Gaetano Belloni of the Bianchi team. Second and third respectively were Italian Angelo Gremo and Frenchman Jean Alavoine.

Of the 49 riders who started the race only 10 crossed the finish line in Milan.

Participants

Of the 49 riders that began the Giro d'Italia on 23 May, ten of them made it to the finish in Milan on 6 June. Riders were allowed to ride on their own or as a member of a team. There were three teams that competed in the race: Bianchi-Pirelli, Legnano-Pirelli, and Stucchi-Pirelli .

The peloton was almost completely composed of Italians. The field featured two former Giro d'Italia champions in the three-time winner Carlo Galetti and returning champion Costante Girardengo. Other notable Italian riders that started the race included Angelo Gremo, Giovanni Gerbi, and Giovanni Rossignoli. Frenchman Jean Alavoine who had some high placings in the Tour de France, along with the successful Belgian cyclist Marcel Buysse started the race.

Final standings

Stage results

General classification

There were ten cyclists who had completed all ten stages. For these cyclists, the times they had needed in each stage was added up for the general classification. The cyclist with the least accumulated time was the winner. Emilio Petiva won the prize for best ranked independent rider in the general classification.

References

Footnotes

Citations

 
Giro d'Italia by year
Giro d'Italia, 1920
Giro d'Italia, 1920
Giro d'Italia
Giro d'Italia